The 2022 AdventHealth 400 was a NASCAR Cup Series race that was held on May 15, 2022, at Kansas Speedway in Kansas City, Kansas. Contested over 267 laps on the  asphalt speedway, it was the 13th race of the 2022 NASCAR Cup Series season.

Report

Background

Kansas Speedway is a  tri-oval race track in Kansas City, Kansas. It was built in 2001 and hosts two annual NASCAR race weekends. The NTT IndyCar Series also raced there until 2011. The speedway is owned and operated by the International Speedway Corporation.

Entry list
 (R) denotes rookie driver.
 (i) denotes driver who is ineligible for series driver points.

Practice

Practice results

Qualifying

Qualifying results

Race

Stage Results

Stage One
Laps: 80

Stage Two
Laps: 85

Final Stage Results

Stage Three
Laps: 102

Race statistics
 Lead changes: 18 among 10 different drivers
 Cautions/Laps: 8 for 47
 Red flags: 0
 Time of race: 3 hours, 13 minutes and 3 seconds
 Average speed:

Media

Television
Fox Sports covered their 11th race at the Kansas Speedway. Mike Joy, Clint Bowyer and Jamie McMurray called the race from the broadcast booth. Jamie Little and Vince Welch handled pit road for the television side. Larry McReynolds provided insight from the Fox Sports studio in Charlotte.

Radio
MRN had the radio call for the race which was also simulcast on Sirius XM NASCAR Radio. Alex Hayden, Jeff Striegle and former crew chief Todd Gordon called the race in the booth when the field raced through the tri-oval. Dave Moody covered the race from the Sunoco spotters stand outside turn 2 when the field was racing through turns 1 and 2. Kurt Becker called the race from a platform outside turn 4. Steve Post, Brienne Pedigo and Jason Toy worked pit road for the radio side.

Standings after the race

Drivers' Championship standings

Manufacturers' Championship standings

Note: Only the first 16 positions are included for the driver standings.
. – Driver has clinched a position in the NASCAR Cup Series playoffs.

References

2022 in sports in Kansas
2022 NASCAR Cup Series
AdventHealth 400
NASCAR races at Kansas Speedway